Ritter is the second lowest-ranking title of nobility in German-speaking areas, just above an Edler, considered roughly equal to the title Knight or Baronet.

Ritter may also refer to:

Places
 Ritter (crater), a lunar crater located near Mare Tranquillitatis
 Ritter, Iowa, a community in the United States
 Ritter Island, a small volcanic island northeast of New Guinea
 Ritter Park, a public park in Huntington, West Virginia
 Ritter Range, a small mountain range in California's Sierra Nevada
 Mount Ritter, the highest peak the Ritter Range

People
Ritter (surname)
Ritter (titular name)

Brands and enterprises
 Ritter Bass Guitars, a manufacturer of high-end electric bass guitars
 Ritter Sport, a German chocolate bar

Schools
 Cardinal Ritter College Prep High School, a high school in St. Louis, Missouri
 Cardinal Ritter High School, a high school in Indianapolis, Indiana
 Liegnitz Ritter-Akademie, a German knight academy founded in the 17th century
 Wolfenbüttel Ritter-Akademie, a German knight academy founded in 1688

Science and healthcare
 Ritter reaction, an organic chemistry reaction
 Ritter's disease, another name for Staphylococcal scalded skin syndrome, a skin disease

Structures
 Frank Ritter Memorial Ice Arena, an ice arena in Rochester, New York
 Ritter Observatory, including Ritter Planetarium, a facility adjacent to Brooks Observatory at the University of Toledo (in Ohio)
 Turnbull-Ritter House, also known as the Sunrise Plantation, an historic home near Lamont, Florida

Other uses
 Josh Ritter (album), the 1999 debut album by Josh Ritter